Bandar Pirshahi (also Romanized as Bandar Pīrshāhī) is a village in Rezvan Rural District, Jebalbarez District, Jiroft County, Kerman Province, Iran. At the 2006 census, its population was 20, in 5 families.

References 

Populated places in Jiroft County